The Old High Court Building is a Heritage Council of Victoria and National Heritage List listed building in Little Bourke Street, Melbourne. The High Court of Australia sat at the building from 1928 to 1980, and the was the location of its registry from 1928 to 1973.

References

Australian National Heritage List
Heritage-listed buildings in Melbourne
Courthouses in Melbourne
Buildings and structures in Melbourne City Centre
1928 establishments in Australia
Buildings and structures completed in 1928